The 46th edition of the Vuelta a Colombia was held from April 21 to May 5, 1996. There were a total number of 106 competitors, including a Spanish rider, (Laudelino Cubino) and an Ecuadorian rider (Héctor Chiles). 77 cyclists finished the stage race.

Stages

1996-04-21: Bogotá — Colmena (5.1 km)

1996-04-22: Chía — Duitama (183.1 km)

1996-04-23: Duitama — Socorro (221.3 km)

1996-04-24: Socorro — Bucaramanga (120 km)

1996-04-25: Bucaramanga — Barrancabermeja (168 km)

1996-04-26: Barrancabermeja — Puerto Boyacá (202 km)

1996-04-27: La Dorada — Villamaría (171.2 km)

1996-04-28: Villamaría — Alto de Santa Helena (221.2 km)

1996-04-29: Medellín — Palestina (223.3 km)

1996-04-30: Chinchiná — Palmira (219 km)

1996-05-01: Cali — Cali (17 km)

1996-05-02: Buga — Córdoba (191.1 km)

1996-05-03: Calarcá — Cajamarca (155 km)

1996-05-04: Ibagué — Bogotá (208 km)

1996-05-05: Bogotá — Bogotá (26 km)

Final classification

Teams 

Pony Malta-Kelme A

Gobernación de Antioquia-Pilsen

Gaseosas Glacial-Selle Italia

Manzana Postobón A

Pony Malta de Bavaria–Avianca A

Todos por Boyacá

Diario Deportivo–Centro Botánico El Polén

Estrellas–Aguardiente Néctar ELC

Municipal de Itagüí

Pony Malta-Kelme B

Lotería de Medellín-Aguardiente Antioqueño

Agua Natural Glacial

Manzana Postobón B

Pony Malta de Bavaria–Avianca B

Cicloases

See also 
 1996 Clásico RCN

References 
 pedalesybielas (Archived 2009-10-22)

Vuelta a Colombia
Colombia
Vuelta Colombia